Michael Leonard Graham Balfour  (22 November 1908 — 16 September 1995) was an English historian and civil servant.

He was born in Oxford, the son of Sir Graham Balfour. He was educated at Rugby School and Balliol College, Oxford, where he graduated with a first in history. He first visited Germany in 1930, where he became a friend of Helmuth James von Moltke. During the Second World War Balfour worked at the Ministry of Information and the Political Intelligence Department of the Foreign Office (the cover name for the Political Warfare Executive). In 1944 he joined the Psychological Warfare Division of the Supreme Headquarters Allied Expeditionary Force and after the war he became Director of Public Relations and Information Services, Control Commission, in the British Zone of Allied-occupied Germany.

He was Chief Information Officer at the Board of Trade from 1947 to 1964. He was then Professor of European History at the University of East Anglia from 1966 to 1974. In 1934 he married Grizel Wilson (younger sister of his Balliol friend, the diplomat Duncan Wilson, and of philosopher Mary Warnock) and they had three daughters. Balfour died in the Oxfordshire town of Witney nine-and-a-half weeks before his 87th birthday.

Works
States and Mind (1953).
Four-Power Control in Germany and Austria 1945-46 (1956).
The Kaiser and His Times (1964).
West Germany (1968).
Helmuth von Moltke. A Leader against Hitler (1972) (co-author Julian Frisby).
Propaganda in War 1939-45 (1979).
The Adversaries (1981).
Britain and Joseph Chamberlain (1985).
Withstanding Hitler in Germany 1933-45 (1988).

Notes

1908 births
1995 deaths
English civil servants
Commanders of the Order of the British Empire
People from Oxford
Academics of the University of East Anglia
20th-century English historians
People educated at Rugby School
Alumni of Balliol College, Oxford